Jaime Mateu (born 28 October 1995, in Palma de Mallorca) is a Spanish skateboarder. He has competed in men's park events at several World Skate Championships, finishing fourth in 2018 and 29th in 2019.

He is set to compete in the men's park event at the 2021 Tokyo Olympics.

References 

Living people
1995 births
Spanish skateboarders
Olympic skateboarders of Spain
Skateboarders at the 2020 Summer Olympics
Sportspeople from Palma de Mallorca